The State Archive of the Russian Federation (GARF) is a large Russian state archive managed by Rosarkhiv (the Federal Archival Agency of Russia). It houses documents from the highest bodies of Russian authority, including:

 some official documents relating to the history of the Russian Empire (mostly concerning the activity of police)
 personal records (including archives of some members of the imperial Romanov from the early 19th century to 1918) 
 official documents of the supreme national legislative and executive institutions of the Russian Provisional Government (1917)
 records of Soviet Russia as an independent state (1917-1922) and as a territorial entity of the USSR (1923-1991)
 archives of the Soviet Union (1922-1991)
 records of the Russian Federation (since 1992)
 documents from many other sources

The State Archive, established in Moscow in 1992, acquired the collections of:

 the Central State Archive of the October Revolution (founded in 1920)
 the Central State Archive of the Russian SFSR (founded in 1957).

Notes

References

 Мироненко С. В. (отв. ред.), История Государственного архива Российской Федерации (документы, статьи, воспоминания), М.: РОССПЭН, 2010.  (Mironenko S. V. (ed.), History of the State archive of Russian Federarion (documents, articles, reminiscences)'', Moscow, ROSSPEN. 2010. )

External links
Official website 
Page about GARF at the Dutch International Institute of Social History 

Archives in Russia
Russia
State archives
Soviet archives
Cultural heritage monuments of federal significance in Moscow